The  are a professional basketball team that competes in the first division of the Japanese B.League. Prior to their entry into the B.League in September 2016, the club was the corporate team of Mitsubishi Electric.

In 2020, the Diamond Dolphins became the first top-tier professional Japanese sports club to sign on to the "Sport for Climate Action Framework" led by the United Nations Framework Convention on Climate Change.

History
The club was formed in 1950 at Mitsubishi Electric's Nagoya factory and entered the second division of Japan's top league in 1973. The club's women's team had previously entered the women's competition of the  upon the league's formation in 1967. Now known as the Mitsubishi Electric Koalas, they continue to compete in the Women's Japan Basketball League.

The men's team was promoted to the first division after winning the second division title in 1984. They finished runners-up in the first division on four occasions, in 1986, 1987, 1989 and 2006.

Previous names
The team has undergone several name changes during its history:
1950-2000: Mitsubishi Electric Nagoya
2000-2007: Melco Dolphins
2007-2013: Mitsubishi Electric Diamond Dolphins
2013-2016: Mitsubishi Electric Diamond Dolphins Nagoya

Current roster

Coaches
Masato Fukushima
Masahiro Fujita
Antonio Lang (2010–14)
Trifon Poch Lopez (2014–15) 
Reggie Geary (2015-2017)
Shingo Kajiyama
Hirohisa Takada (asst)

Notable players
To appear in this section a player must have either:
- Set a club record or won an individual award as a professional player.
- Played at least one official international match for his senior national team at any time.

Arenas
Dolphins Arena
Park Arena Komaki
Saorina

Practice facilities

Mitsubishi Electric Nagoya Gymnasium

References

 
Basketball teams established in 1950
Basketball teams in Japan
Sports teams in Aichi Prefecture
1950 establishments in Japan